{{DISPLAYTITLE:C4H9N}}
The molecular formula C4H9N (molar mass: 71.12 g/mol) may refer to:

 Pyrrolidine (azolidine)
 Cyclobutylamine (cyclobutanamine)
 2,2-Dimethylaziridine
 1,2-Dimethylaziridine

Molecular formulas